I've Never Seen Star Wars is a comedy talk show broadcast on BBC Radio 4. Hosted by comedian Marcus Brigstocke, each episode features a celebrity guest trying out experiences that are new to them, but common to many others. The title comes from the show's producer and creator, Bill Dare, having never seen the Star Wars films. The series has been the subject of controversy due to the questionable taste of some of the experiences.

The show has been adapted for television and was first broadcast on BBC Four in early 2009.

Format
Each episode features a guest presenting a list of things to Brigstocke that, until coming on the show, they had never done before but many others have. Generally the show is structured around one each of certain types of experiences; reading a new book, listening to some new music, watching a new film or television programme (for all of these, the guest is often given an example of a genre they've never sampled before), eating a new food and taking part in a new leisure activity. Examples of the latter include comedian Phill Jupitus having his first colonic irrigation, magician Paul Daniels learning how to swim and Goodies star Tim Brooke-Taylor buying his first pornographic magazine.

Reception
The series has a mixed reception. Critics have praised the format. Chris Campling said I've Never Seen Star Wars is, "one of the most invigorating new comedy series of the 21st century."

Elisabeth Mahoney in The Guardian wrote about Jupitus' appearance saying: "He also tried colonic irrigation, and the recording of that was one of the funniest bits of radio this year. The therapist explained the process in a deadpan manner that was quite majestic, especially when she let her "tubing clamps" make their worrying sound effect. Jupitus fretted that she'd find "some hidden G-spot of delight" and that he'd become "sexually addicted to having my arse pumped out". Rather worryingly, then, he has already booked his next appointment."

However, the series has been attacked because of some of the experiences which have appeared. Jupitus' colonic irrigation and eating foie gras, and Brooke-Taylor buying pornography are amongst the moments which have been cause for complaint. Dare appeared on BBC Radio 4's listener complaints show Feedback to defend I've Never Seen Star Wars. Dare stated the choices were all made by the guests and were not designed to offend listeners. During the interview with host Roger Bolton, Dare was asked, "if he could reassure listeners that there'd be no heavy breathing in future." Dare mocked  both Feedback and Bolton saying: "Only if we get an asthmatic on, I suppose. But now asthmatics are going to ring up and say, how dare you make fun of our condition?"

Episodes
Six series of I've Never Seen Star Wars have been broadcast.

Series 1

Series 2

Series 3

Series 4

Series 5

Series 6

References

External links

 
 

BBC Radio 4 programmes
BBC Radio comedy programmes
2008 radio programme debuts
Radio programs adapted into television shows